Spasov or Spassov is a Bulgarian masculine surname, its feminine counterpart is Spasova or Spassova . Notable people with the surname include:

Anton Spasov (born 1975), Bulgarian footballer
Bozhidar Spasov (born 1949), Bulgarian composer
Daniel Spassov, Bulgarian folk singer
Dime Spasov (born 1985), Macedonian politician
Emil Spasov (born 1956), Bulgarian footballer
Ferario Spasov (born 1962), Bulgarian football coach
Hristo Spasov (born 1988), Bulgarian footballer 
Jeanette Spassova (born 1962), Bulgarian actress
Larisa Spasova (born 1960), Bulgarian basketball player
Luben Spasov (born 1943), Bulgarian chess grandmaster
Nikola Spasov (born 1958), Bulgarian footballer
Petar Spasov (born 1934), Bulgarian boxer
Rositsa Spasova (born 1954), Bulgarian rower
Rumyana Spasova (born 1989), Bulgarian pair skater
Saltirka Spasova-Tarpova (born 1933), Bulgarian gymnast
Spas Spasov (born 1990), Bulgarian footballer
Theodosii Spassov (born 1961), Bulgarian jazz musician 
Valentin Spasov (born 1946), Bulgarian basketball player
Vasil Spasov (disambiguation) – multiple people

Bulgarian-language surnames